Krasnaya Zarya is a rural locality (a settlement) in Nikolskoye Rural Settlement, Kaduysky District, Vologda Oblast, Russia. The population was 9 as of 2002.

Geography 
Krasnaya Zarya is located 64 km north of Kaduy (the district's administrative centre) by road. Danilkovo is the nearest rural locality.

References 

Rural localities in Kaduysky District